Matthew Andrew Banahan (born 30 December 1986) is an English former rugby union player who played for Bath in the Aviva Premiership. He is also a former England international. His main position was wing, however he could also operate as an inside or outside centre.

Early life
Banahan grew up playing field hockey, earning selection to the Jersey and West of England junior representative sides before he decided his hockey career was stalled and switching to rugby union. Banahan went to La Moye school, Les Quennevais School and Highlands College.

Club career
Banahan moved to Bath in the summer of 2006, after previously appearing for the London Irish Academy and was brought to the Recreation Ground as a lock. He had also been involved with the RFU's Junior National Academy set-up and, England's sevens set up.

He switched to wing where his powerful combination of size, strength and speed made him a potent weapon in the Bath United and Development sides, for whom he scored ten tries in fourteen games last season.

Quickly promoted to the first team from the Academy set up, Banahan made 26 first grade appearances and finished the 2007/08 season as the club's top try scorer (16) and the Guinness Premiership regular season's second highest (10) behind Leicester's Tom Varndell (13).

On 10 January 2018, it was announced by Bath that Banahan will be leaving after 12-year association to West Country rivals, Gloucester from the 2018–19 season.

On 29 November 2020, Banahan announced his retirement from all forms of rugby competition at the end of the 2020-21 season.

International career
Banahan was selected for the "wider" England Sevens squad in the 2007–08 IRB Sevens World Series, which refers to a pool of players who supplement the 11 core squad members. As a member of the wider squad, he was eligible for selection for up to four of the eight events in the tournament. He was also selected for the England Saxons squad to play in the 2008 Churchill Cup. He celebrated his Saxons debut by scoring a hat trick in a 64–10 victory over the USA in the opening round. He then scored two tries against Ireland A and one in the final against Scotland A.

Banahan played for England on Saturday 30 May 2009 against the Barbarians at Twickenham in an uncapped game where he scored a try. He was called up to the  squad for their summer tour replacing David Strettle who was ruled out through injury. He made his full England debut on 6 June 2009 in a comfortable win over Argentina at Old Trafford where he also scored a try and was named 'Man of the Match'. He retained his place for England's 2009 Autumn series against Australia, Argentina and New Zealand, and scored his third international try in the win against Argentina.

Banahan made his first start in the centre for England during their 2010 Autumn series, playing at outside centre in the game versus Samoa on 20 November 2010. He scored a try when England were trailing 6–8, and set up England's second through an intercepted pass. On the back of this performance, he was named on the bench for England's final game of 2010 against South Africa.

Banahan last played for England in October 2011.

International tries

Post rugby career
On 28 January 2021, Banahan will return to Bath to become the Glasshouse Academy manager with the Bath Recreation team and a Sports Ambassador from July 2021.

References

External links
Banahan profile Bath Rugby
Career Stats Statbunker

1986 births
Living people
Rugby union wings
England international rugby union players
Bath Rugby players
Gloucester Rugby players
Jersey rugby union players